The Soetwater Wind Power Station is an operational  wind power plant in South Africa. The power station was developed and is owned by Enel Green Power, an IPP and subsidiary of the Italian multinational, ENEL. The energy generated at this wind farm is sold to the South African national electricity utility company Eskom Holdings, under a 20-year power purchase agreement (PPA).

Location
The power station is located outside of the town of Sutherland, in Karoo Hoogland Municipality, in Namakwa District, in Northern Cape Province.

Overview
The power station comprises 35 turbines manufactured by Vestas Wind Systems, based in Denmark, rated at 4.2 MW each, capable of capacity generation of 147 MW. Enel Green Power won the concession to build this power station in 2016 as part of the 4th window of the Renewable Energy Independent Power Producer Procurement Programme (REIPPP), of the South African government.

Soetwater Wind Power Station is one of five wind park concessions awarded to Enel Green Power, under the South African government's Renewable Energy Supply Programme (REIPPP). The other four wind farms are (a) Oyster Bay Wind Power Station (b) Garob Wind Power Station (c) Karusa Wind Power Station and (d) Nxuba Wind Power Station. Each wind farm has installed capacity of between 140 MW and 147 MW.

Developers
The Soetwater Wind Power Station was developed and is owned and  currently operated by Enel Green Power, headquartered in Johannesburg, South Africa. Enel Green Power is a subsidiary of ENEL, the Italian energy conglomerate, based in Rome, Italy.

Funding
The construction of this wind farm cost in excess of US$208 million. Funding was partially sources in form of loans, from Absa Group and Nedbank Group, two South African financial houses.

Other considerations
Soetwater wind farm brings Enel Green Power's portfolio in South Africa to seven wind farms, with generation capacity in excess of 800 MW. It is calculated that the wind farm adds 585 GWh to the South African national grid every year. This enables the country avoid the emission of 600,000 tonnes of carbon dioxide annually.

See also

 List of power stations in South Africa

References

External links
 70 of the largest wind turbines ever seen in Africa will head for the Karoo  As of 28 October 2018.

Economy of the Northern Cape
Wind farms in South Africa
Energy infrastructure in Africa
2022 establishments in South Africa
Energy infrastructure completed in 2022
Namakwa District Municipality
21st-century architecture in South Africa